Ramón Alfredo Castro Muñoz (born October 23, 1979 in Valencia, Carabobo, Venezuela) is a retired Venezuelan infielder. He has played in Major League Baseball (MLB) for the Oakland Athletics.

Baseball career

Atlanta Braves
Castro was originally signed as a free agent with the Atlanta Braves in 1996. After six years in their minor league system, he was granted free agency.

Oakland Athletics
Castro signed with the Oakland Athletics in 2003. He was called up from the Triple-A Sacramento River Cats and made his MLB debut on June 22, 2004 as a Pinch Hitter for Bobby Crosby. He played in his final game as a Defensive Replacement at Shortstop for Bobby Crosby for the Athletics a month later on July 26, 2004. He Wore #47 & played in nine games for the Athletics. With Sacramento, Castro batted .233 (27-for-116) with one home run, 15 RBI, 15 runs, eight doubles, two triples and one stolen base. With the Athletics, he hit .133 (2-for-15) with three RBI, one run, and one double in nine games.

Washington Nationals
In 2005, Castro played in the Washington Nationals organization, but was suspended 105 games in July and fined an undisclosed amount for violating the steroids policy.

Newark Bears
He previously played for the Newark Bears from 2007 to 2008, being named the Most Valuable Player of the 2008 Atlantic League All-Star Game after hitting two home runs. In 2008, he hit .352 with 23 home runs and 84 RBI.

San Francisco Giants
On June 26, 2009 Castro signed a minor league contract with the San Francisco Giants.

Guerreros de Oaxaca
He played in five games with the Guerreros de Oaxaca in 2010.

York Revolution
Castro set Revolution season records in 2010 with a .339 batting average, 37 doubles and a .437 on-base percentage, ranking second in the Atlantic League in all three categories. His performance earned him First Team Atlantic League All-Star honors for the third time in his career. The Valencia, Venezuela native also had a 68-game errorless streak from May 15, 2010 through July 29, 2010. Then, he went on to bat .375 in the 2010 postseason. His final highlight was driving in the championship-clinching run on a tenth-inning sacrifice fly during Game 3 of the Atlantic League Championship Series at Bridgeport Bluefish.

Rimini Baseball Club
Castro batted .328 (397-for-1396) in 1,396 Atlantic League games before joining the Rimini BBC in 2013.

Bridgeport Bluefish
Castro signed with the Bridgeport Bluefish for the 2014 season. Castro played in 127 games for the Bluefish.

Kansas City Royals
On March 24, 2015, Castro signed a minor league deal with the Kansas City Royals for the 2015 season.

See also
 List of Major League Baseball players from Venezuela

References

External links

Venezuelan Professional Baseball League statistics

1979 births
Living people
Bridgeport Bluefish players
Central American and Caribbean Games bronze medalists for Venezuela
Competitors at the 2006 Central American and Caribbean Games
Connecticut Defenders players
Eugene Emeralds players
Greenville Braves players
Guerreros de Oaxaca players
Gulf Coast Braves players
Harrisburg Senators players
Macon Braves players
Major League Baseball players from Venezuela
Major League Baseball third basemen
Mexican League baseball third basemen
Midland RockHounds players
Myrtle Beach Pelicans players
Newark Bears players
Oakland Athletics players
Pastora de los Llanos players
Potomac Nationals players
Richmond Braves players
Rimini Baseball Club players
Rojos del Águila de Veracruz players
Sacramento River Cats players
Sportspeople from Valencia, Venezuela
Tigres de Aragua players
Venezuelan expatriate baseball players in Italy
Venezuelan expatriate baseball players in Mexico
Venezuelan expatriate baseball players in the United States
Venezuelan sportspeople in doping cases
York Revolution players
Central American and Caribbean Games medalists in baseball